Aslaug is a Norwegian given name, derived from Old Norse prefix áss-, meaning "god", and suffix -laug, possible meaning "betrothed woman".  The Swedish cognate is Aslög; the Danish cognate is Asløg.  Aslaug is uncommon as a surname.  People with the name Aslaug include:

 Aslaug, a queen of Scandinavian mythology
 Aslaug Dahl (born 1949), Norwegian, Olympic cross-country skier
 Åslaug Grinde (1931–2019), Norwegian politician  
 Åslaug Haga (born 1959), Norwegian politician
 Åslaug Linge Sunde (1917–2006), Norwegian politician

Feminine given names
Norwegian feminine given names